The 2022–23 Scottish League Cup, also known as the Premier Sports Cup（until Semi-finals）/ Viaplay Cup（Final）for sponsorship reasons, was the 77th season of Scotland's second-most prestigious football knockout competition. Celtic were the defending champions. They retained the title to win the competition for a 21st time.

Schedule

Format
The format for the 2022–23 competition was similar to the previous six seasons; however, this season the group stage was not regionalised. The competition began with eight groups of five teams. The five clubs initially competing in the UEFA Champions League (Celtic and Rangers), Europa League (Heart of Midlothian) and Europa Conference League (Dundee United and Motherwell) qualifying rounds received a bye to the second round. The group stage consisted of 40 teams: all remaining teams that competed across the SPFL in 2021–22, and the 2021–22 Highland Football League champions (Fraserburgh) and runners-up (Buckie Thistle), and the 2021–22 Lowland Football League champions (Bonnyrigg Rose Athletic).

The winners of each of the eight groups, as well as the three best runners-up, progressed to the second round (last 16). At this stage, the competition reverted to the traditional knock-out format. The three group winners with the highest points total and the European entrants were seeded.

Bonus point system
The traditional point system of awarding three points for a win and one point for a draw was used; however, for each group stage match that finished in a draw, a penalty shoot-out took place, with the winner being awarded a bonus point.

Group stage

The teams were seeded according to their final league positions in 2021–22 and drawn into eight groups, with each group comprising one team from each pot. The draw for the group stage took place on 25 May 2022 and was broadcast live on FreeSports & the SPFL YouTube channel.

Group A

Group B

Group C

Group D

Group E

Group F

Group G

Group H

Best runners-up

Knockout phase

Second round

Draw and seeding
Celtic, Dundee United, Heart of Midlothian, Motherwell and Rangers entered the competition at this stage, due to their participation in UEFA club competitions.

The draw took place on 24 July 2022, following the Aberdeen v Raith Rovers match.

Teams in bold advanced to the quarter-finals.

Matches

Quarter-finals
The draw took place on 31 August 2022, following the Ross County v Celtic match.

Matches

Semi-finals
The draw took place on 19 October 2022, following the Rangers v Dundee match. VAR was used for the first time in the tournament when it was introduced at the semi-final stage.

Matches

Final

Media coverage
The domestic broadcasting rights for the competition are held exclusively by Premier Sports, who will broadcast between 12 and 16 live matches per season, as well as highlights.

The following matches were broadcast live on UK television:

Top goalscorers

References

Scottish League Cup seasons
League Cup
League Cup